Events from the year 1551 in India.

Events
 The first volume of "História do descobrimento e conquista da Índia pelos portugueses" (History of the discovery and conquest of India by the Portuguese) by Portuguese historia Fernão Lopes de Castanheda is published

Births
 Nizamuddin Ahmad,  Muslim historian of late medieval India (died 1621)

Deaths
 Hindal Mirza Mughal prince and youngest son of Emperor Babur dies (born 1519)

See also

 Timeline of Indian history

References

Sources
História do descobrimento e conquista da Índia pelos portugueses, Book I (full text in Portuguese).